Raul Liviu Diaconu (born 11 July 1989 in Bucharest, Romania) is a Romanian football player under contract with Steaua II București.

References

External links
 Raul Liviu Diaconu's profile (Romanian)

1989 births
Living people
Romanian footballers
FC Steaua II București players
Association football fullbacks